Nevada Smith is a 1966 American Western film.

Nevada Smith may also refer to:

 Nevada Smith (1975 film), a TV Western based on the 1966 film
 Nevada Smith, a fictional character played by Alan Ladd in the film The Carpetbaggers
 Nevada Smith (basketball) (born 1981), an American basketball coach
 Nevada Smith, a playable character in the Apogee games Pharaoh's Tomb and Arctic Adventure